The Samsung Galaxy A41 is a mid-range Android smartphone developed by Samsung Electronics as part of their 2020 A-series smartphone lineup. It was announced on 18 March 2020, and first released on 22 May 2020 as the successor to the Galaxy A40. The phone comes preinstalled with Android 10 and Samsung’s custom One UI 2.1 software overlay.

Specifications

Hardware 
The Galaxy A41 is equipped with a MediaTek Helio P65 chipset, with 64 GB of storage and 4 GB of RAM, as well as a dedicated slot for microSD and a dual nano SIM slot with supports VoLTE. Storage can be expanded up to 512 GB via a microSDXC card.

The phone has a 6.1-inch, FHD+ Super AMOLED display, with a screen-to-body ratio of 85.9% and an aspect ratio of 20:9 to match that of other Galaxy smartphones sold in 2020. An optical, under-display fingerprint reader replaces the rear-mounted one seen on the A40.

The new L-shaped rear camera system (similar to the ones seen on newer Samsung phones) utilizes three cameras, a 48 MP wide lens, an 8 MP ultrawide lens and a 5 MP depth sensor. A U-shaped screen cut-out houses the 25 MP sensor for the front-facing camera. Both camera systems are capable of recording 1080p video at 30fps.

A 3500 mAh battery is used, with support for fast charging at up to 15 W.

Customers, depending on the region, can choose from a range of new colour selections, such like Black, Haze Silver, Prism Blue and Aura Red.

Software 
The phone comes with Android 10 and Samsung’s custom One UI 2.1 software overlay. Depending on the region, it can support contactless NFC payments through Samsung Pay and other various payment apps that can be installed separately.

Software experience is comparable to that of other 2020 Samsung devices, and it boasts many of the software perks costlier Samsung devices boast, such as Edge Screen and Edge Lighting.

As with most other Samsung phones released during 2020, the Microsoft-Samsung partnership Link to Windows option which comes as standard, can be accessed in the Android notification panel.

Banking on Samsung’s latest software update schedule, the phone should be eligible for two major Android upgrades.

References

External links
 Official website

Android (operating system) devices
Samsung smartphones
Samsung Galaxy
Mobile phones introduced in 2020
Mobile phones with multiple rear cameras